The Turn of the Screw is a 20th-century English chamber opera composed by Benjamin Britten with a libretto by Myfanwy Piper, "wife of the artist John Piper, who had been a friend of the composer since 1935 and had provided designs for several of the operas". The libretto is based on the 1898 novella The Turn of the Screw by Henry James. The opera was commissioned by the Venice Biennale and given its world premiere on 14 September 1954, at the Teatro La Fenice, Venice. The original recording was made during January of the next year, with the composer conducting.

Described as one of the most dramatically appealing English operas, the opera in two acts has a prologue and sixteen scenes, each preceded by a variation on the twelve-note 'Screw' theme. Typically of Britten, the music mixes tonality and dissonance, with Britten's recurrent use of a twelve-tone figure being perhaps a nod to the approach of Arnold Schoenberg. Thematically, the play gives a central role to a line borrowed from W. B. Yeats' poem "The Second Coming": "The ceremony of innocence is drowned."

Performance history

The opera was given its British premiere on 6 October 1954 by the Sadler's Wells Opera in London; the North American premiere on 23 August 1957 at Canada's Stratford Festival with the English Opera Group; the US premiere followed on 19 March 1958 at the New York College of Music. Since then there have been regular performances around the world.

In 2003, English Touring Opera presented the work throughout England and three years later Glyndebourne Touring Opera toured the UK with their new production of the work before reviving it in 2007 at their summer festival, Glyndebourne Festival Opera. Opera Queensland's staged Neil Armfield's production in 2005 which featured the solo professional operatic debut of Kate Miller-Heidke as Flora.

Los Angeles Opera performed the Glyndebourne Touring Opera production of the work in 2011 under music director James Conlon. OperaUpClose reframed the opera in their 2011 production, the story being told from the point of the view of the Governess as a patient in an asylum. It is left unclear as to whether the story stems completely from her mind or whether she arrived there after her experiences in the Bly house. Opera Moderne produced the work in 2012 at Symphony Space in New York under the stage direction of Luke Leonard.

Opera Holland Park received positive reviews of their presentation of the work in six performances in summer 2014.

For a limited run in 2018, Regent's Park Open Air Theatre presented a co-production with the English National Opera, directed by Timothy Sheader and conducted by Toby Purser.

On 6 June 2021, a version by OperaGlass Works was broadcast by BBC4. The new staging of the opera, at Wilton's Music Hall, London, had been scheduled for a run in March 2020, but this was prevented by the lockdown. Instead, the performance was reworked as a film, shot on location at the Victorian music hall. The whole space of the venue, not just the stage, was used to tell the story.

Roles

Synopsis
Time: The middle of the nineteenth century
Place: Bly, an English country house

Prologue
A singer known as Prologue tells about a young governess (who remains unnamed throughout the opera) he once knew who cared for two children at Bly House. She had been hired by their uncle and guardian, who lived in London and was too busy to care for them. After hiring her, he laid three stipulations on the Governess: Never to write to him about the children, never to inquire about the history of Bly House, and never to abandon the children.

Act 1

The Governess is apprehensive about her new position. When she arrives at Bly House, the housekeeper, Mrs. Grose, and the children greet her. When the Governess sees Miles, the little boy, their eyes lock and the Governess feels as if she has a strange connection with Miles. Mrs. Grose interrupts their reverie and leads the Governess off to explore the beautiful land around the house. The Governess sings that all her fears are now gone. A letter from Miles' school arrives, advising the Governess that the boy has been expelled but giving no reason. The Governess is sure that Miles, like his sister Flora, is too innocent to have done anything bad enough for expulsion. Encouraged by Mrs. Grose, she decides to ignore the letter.

The Governess sings about her wonderful position at the house and the beautiful children she has in her care. But she is troubled by footsteps she has heard outside her door and cries in the night. Suddenly, she spots a pale-faced man perched on a tower of the house. When the man disappears, she becomes frightened and wonders if she has seen a ghost. Her mind is put at ease by the playing of the children, and their singing of the nursery rhyme "Tom, Tom, the Piper's Son". Later she sees the same man looking in through a window. She decides to ask Mrs. Grose about the man. Based on her description the housekeeper tells the Governess about Peter Quint, the former valet at Bly House. Mrs. Grose implies that Quint may have been a pederast who preyed on Miles, and that he had a sexual relationship with Miss Jessel, the young and beautiful previous governess. Mrs. Grose hints that Miss Jessel, too, had a relationship to the children that seemed inappropriately close. The housekeeper did nothing, since Quint intimidated her, and she explains "it wasn't my place". Miss Jessel left the house and eventually died. Shortly thereafter, Quint died under mysterious circumstances on an icy road near Bly House. The Governess rededicates herself to protecting the children. The next morning, the Governess is teaching Miles Latin, when he suddenly enters into a trance-like state and sings a song, "Malo".

Later that day, the Governess sits by the side of a lake with Flora. Flora recites the names of the seas of the world, finishing with the Dead Sea. Flora's comparison of the Dead Sea with Bly House unsettles the Governess. As Flora plays on the shore with her doll, the Governess suddenly sees a strange woman across the lake who seems to be watching Flora. The horrified Governess realises that the woman is a ghost — the ghost of Miss Jessel, who has returned to claim Flora. The Governess hurries Flora home to safety.

That night, Miles and Flora slip out into the woods to meet Miss Jessel and Peter Quint. The children fantasize about a world where dreams come true. The Governess and Mrs. Grose arrive as the children are about to be possessed, and the spirits depart. Miles sings a haunting song about how he has been a bad boy.

Act 2
The ghosts of Peter Quint and Miss Jessel reappear. They argue about who harmed whom first when they were alive, and accuse one another of not acting quickly enough to possess the children. In her room, the Governess worries about the evil she feels in the house.

The next morning, the family goes to church. The children sing a song which sounds similar to a psalm. Mrs. Grose declares that nothing can be wrong if the children are as sweet as this. The Governess tells her of Miles' unearthly day-dream song and Flora's bizarre behaviour. Alarmed, Mrs. Grose advises the Governess to write to their employer in London. At first, the Governess declines, recalling her employer's admonitions before she took the job. But when Miles mentions the ghosts of Quint and Jessel, the Governess realises things are much more dire than they seem. She resolves to leave Bly House.

After church, the family returns home. The Governess goes into the children's schoolroom where she sees the ghost of Miss Jessel seated at the teacher's desk. The spectre bemoans her fate, and sings about how she suffers in the afterlife. The Governess confronts the spirit, which vanishes. Believing the ghosts may not yet have the upper hand, the Governess changes her mind, deciding to stay at Bly House after all. Instead, she writes to the children's uncle, informing him that she must speak with him.

That night, the Governess tells Miles that she has written to his uncle about the spirits haunting Bly House. She departs. The voice of Quint calls out to Miles, terrifying him. The lights go out, and the ghost hovers over the terrified child. Quint tells Miles to steal the letter. The boy goes to the schoolroom, finds the letter, and takes it back to his room.

The next morning, Miles plays the piano for the Governess and Mrs. Grose. While the Governess is distracted by his performance, Flora slips off to go to the lake. When the two women realise Flora is gone, they search for her. Finding the girl at the lake, the Governess sees the spectre of Miss Jessel nearby—but Mrs. Grose sees nothing. The Governess tries to force Flora to admit that the apparition is there, but Flora denies seeing anything and hurls invective at the Governess. Mrs. Grose, convinced the Governess has gone too far, angrily takes Flora home. The Governess feels betrayed by Mrs. Grose.

That night, Flora begins to rant and rave about committing unspeakable horrors. Mrs. Grose agrees to take Flora away from the house. The housekeeper tells the Governess that the letter was never mailed and that Miles must have taken it. The Governess confronts Miles alone. As she questions him, the ghost of Quint pressures Miles not to betray him. Hysterical, Miles confesses that he took the letter. The Governess demands to know who put Miles up to it. Miles blurts out Quint's name. At the mention of his name, Quint's ghost vanishes and Miles falls dead on the floor. A weeping Governess cradles the dead child in her arms, singing aloud of her grief and wondering if she did the right thing after all.

The twelve-note 'Screw' theme
Britten's twelve-tone 'Screw' theme divides into three equivalent tetrachords, each a segment of the circle of fifths: D–A–E–B, F–C–D–G
, B–F–C–G, which are played in the sequence of A–D–B–E, C–F–D–G, F–B–G–C.

Additionally, two whole-tone scales are contained in the row:

The theme as it first appears in the piano, 9 measures before rehearsal number 1:

Instrumentation

Lyric and melodic sources
For the children's music, Britten drew words and melody from a number of traditional British nursery rhymes, including Tom, Tom, the Piper's Son and Lavender's Blue. Of particular note is Miles' song "Malo." The lyrics to this are a mnemonic for beginning Latin students. The word malo can be either a form of the adjective for "bad", or the first-person singular of the verb malle, "to prefer," which has an irregular conjugation and is a common stumbling block for students. Malo could also be a form of the scientific name for the apple species. The rhyme Miles sings helps students to keep in mind the three possible meanings for "malo" when encountered in a text for translation: adjective of wickedness, verb of preference, or apple tree. The Latin words that are used in the lesson scene have been examined in more detail for their paedophilic innuendos. The line "The ceremony of innocence is drowned" sung by Quint and Miss Jessel is taken from the poem "The Second Coming" by W. B. Yeats.

Selected recordings

References 
Notes

Cited sources
 
 
 

Other sources
 Warrack, John and West, Ewan, The Oxford Dictionary of Opera, (1992), 782 pages, . p. 723
 Whittall, Arnold (1998), "The Turn of the Screw" in Stanley Sadie, (ed.), The New Grove Dictionary of Opera, Vol. Four pp. 847–849. London: Macmillan Publishers, Inc. 1998

External links

Score, Boosey & Hawkes (registration required)
  "Arda Mandikian, obituary", Daily Telegraph (London), 23 November 2009 online at telegraph.co.uk. Retrieved 11 January 2010. (registration required)
 Recordings of The Turn of the Screw on operadis-opera-discography.org.uk

Operas by Benjamin Britten
English-language operas
Chamber operas
1954 operas
Operas
Opera world premieres at La Fenice
Operas based on novels
The Turn of the Screw